West Hampton Dunes is an incorporated village in the Town of Southampton on Westhampton Island, in Suffolk County, in New York, United States, off the South Shore of Long Island. The population was 55 at the 2010 census.

History
West Hampton Dunes is located on a barrier island in the Town of Southampton.  The barrier island was part of Fire Island until a nor'easter in 1931 split the island creating Moriches Inlet. The inlet created a geographic oddity whereby the town of Brookhaven actually has jurisdiction on land immediately west of West Hampton Dunes although Brookhaven land access to it involves a nearly  drive through Southampton.

The village incorporated in 1993 in attempt to have more control over its precarious state since it was obliterated in the Great Hurricane of 1938, 1991 Halloween Nor'easter ("The Perfect Storm") and again in a 1992 nor'easter. Specifically, the village wanted to have a say in U.S. Army Corps of Engineers handling of the barrier beach—particularly in response to a series of groynes at Shinnecock Inlet that have created major beach erosion "downstream" in the longshore drift. Almost immediately after incorporation, Gary Vegliante, the village's first and to date only mayor, sued the U.S. Army Corps of Engineers for $200 million.  The Corps settled the suit and began replenishing the beach leading to a building boom on what had been a devastated empty section of beach.

The American Shore and Beach Preservation Association named West Hampton Dunes one of America's top restored beaches. In 2007, resident Yale Nelson finished a documentary on the town history which premiered October 20, 2007, in Westhampton at the Hamptons Film Festival.

In 1996, West Hampton Dunes was the closest community to the crash of TWA Flight 800, which occurred in the ocean about  due south of it, although news reports focused on the much larger communities across Moriches Bay that provided the water response.

Police
In 1996, the village, under the authority of a court order, formed a law enforcement agency to better serve the needs of the community. The West Hampton Dunes Police Constabulary consists of approximately 12 members, including a department commissioner and two sergeants. The members are certified as peace officers with the New York State Division of Criminal Justice Services (DCJS) and are trained at either the Suffolk Police and/or Suffolk Sheriffs academy. The members of the department also receive the required DCJS courses for peace officers to perform traffic enforcement duties including Radar/LIDAR, Standard Field Sobriety, and Basic Crash Management.

Geography

Demographics

As of the census of 2000, there were 11 people, 7 households, and 3 families residing in the village. The population density was 32.2 people per square mile (12.5/km2). There were 172 housing units at an average density of 503.6 per square mile (195.3/km2). The racial makeup of the village was 90.91% White and 9.09% Asian.

There were 7 households, out of which none had children under the age of 18 living with them, 42.9% were married couples living together, and 42.9% were non-families. 42.9% of all households were made up of individuals, and 28.6% had someone living alone who was 65 years of age or older. The average household size was 1.57 and the average family size was 2.00.

In the village, the population was spread out, with 18.2% from 25 to 44, 36.4% from 45 to 64, and 45.5% who were 65 years of age or older. The median age was 58 years. For every 100 females age 18 and over, there were 266.7 males.

The median income for a household in the village was $67,083, and the median income for a family was $127,308. Males had a median income of $32,083 versus $0 for females. The per capita income for the village was $57,150. None of the population and none of the families were below the poverty line.

Government 
As of August 2021, the Mayor of West Hampton Dunes is Gary Vegliante, and the Village Trustees are Michael Craig, John J. Eff, Jr, Harvey Gessin, and Gary Trimarchi.

Education
West Hampton Dunes is within the Remsenburg-Speonk Union Free School District.

References

External links

 Official website
 The Barrier Beach Preservation Association of West Hampton Dunes
 "Documenting a fight against the tide", Newsday, October 14, 2007
 "West Hampton Dunes: Back from the Brink", The NY Times, August 10, 2003
 "Beach Nourishment: The lessons from one Long Island Community", A case study on West Hampton Dunes by the National Oceanic and Atmospheric Administration Coastal Services Center

Southampton (town), New York
Villages in New York (state)
Villages in Suffolk County, New York
Populated coastal places in New York (state)